Lakshmi is a 1982 Hindi-language drama film, produced by Raja and Desai under the Roy Films banner and  directed by B.S. Thapa. It stars Raj Babbar and Reena Roy. Jeetendra makes a special appearance and music was composed by Usha Khanna.

Plot 
Lakshmi, the daughter of a poor postmaster, marries Vijay Singh, the only son of a rich Zamindar. Lakshmi gives birth to a male child Ajay Singh, affectionately called Pappu. Meanwhile, Vijay goes abroad for higher education. Vijay returns from abroad and a very big party is thrown in his honor, but most unfortunately, Vijay dies an accident on the same night of the party and thus Lakshmi's misery begins. Lakshmi's ill fate is held responsible for this incident. She is tortured by her mother-in-law. She is blamed for everything and ultimately she has to leave home in a state of pregnancy. As the fate would have it, she was trapped in the red-light area, She accepts the profession of dancing, but all the time, keeping her chastity and purity intact and changes her name as Neelam Bai. She gives birth to a female child named as Geeta, here, Habu, a pimp, becomes the brother to Lakshmi and assures her that he will protect her. She kept Geeta away from this atmosphere in a boarding school. Simultaneously, Lakshmi kept an eye on her son Pappu also, time passes; her son and daughter grow. When she learns that her son Ajay Singh needs money for going abroad for higher education, she is in a disguise and on some pretext gives money to her son. She has now only one ambition left; to see her daughter married to a good boy, but when everything seems to be smooth, Moti Seth, one time ardent admirer of Lakshmi, casts his evil eye on her daughter. Ultimately, Lakshmi gives poison to Moti Seth and murders him. The court trial starts, to her surprise, the Public prosecutor accusing her was none else but her own son Ajay / Pappu.

Cast 
Raj Babbar as Vijay Singh and Ajay Singh / Pappu (dual role)
Reena Roy as Lakshmi / Neelam Bai
Ranjeet as Habbu
Jeetendra as Qawali Singer
Vinod Mehra as Mohan Saxena
Kader Khan as Daku
Om Shivpuri as Tagore Saab
Bharat Kapoor as Mothi Lal
Danny D'Souza as Lawyer
Nadira as Tamana Bai
Dina Pathak as Vijay's mother
Sulakshana Pandit as Qawali Singer

Soundtrack

References 

1982 films
1980s Hindi-language films
Films scored by Usha Khanna